Shinzo Abe, the former prime minister of Japan and a serving member of the House of Representatives, was assassinated on 8 July 2022 while speaking at a political event outside Yamato-Saidaiji Station in Nara City, Nara Prefecture, Japan. While delivering a campaign speech for a Liberal Democratic Party (LDP) candidate, he was shot from behind at close range by a man with a homemade firearm. Abe was transported by a medical helicopter to Nara Medical University Hospital, where he was pronounced dead.

The suspect, 41-year-old Tetsuya Yamagami, was arrested at the scene for attempted murder; the charge was later upgraded to murder after Abe was pronounced dead. Yamagami told investigators that he had shot Abe in relation to a grudge he held against the Unification Church (UC), to which Abe and his family had political ties, over his mother's bankruptcy in 2002. The alleged motive brought renewed interest from Japanese society and media regarding criticism against the UC's alleged practice of pressuring believers into making exorbitant donations. Japanese dignitaries and legislators have been forced to disclose their relationship with the UC to the public. Prime Minister Fumio Kishida reshuffled the cabinet earlier on 10 August 2022, but one of the few retaining ministers, Daishiro Yamagiwa, resigned on 24 October 2022 as the approval of the cabinet continued to plummet over the UC scandal. The assassination triggered an announcement on 31 August 2022 that the LDP would no longer have any relationship with the UC and its associated organisations, and would expel its members if they did not break ties with the UC. In addition, on 10 December, the House of Representatives and the House of Councillors passed two bills to restrict the activities of religious organisations such as the UC and provide relief to victims.

Leaders from many countries expressed shock and dismay at Abe's assassination, which was the first of a former Japanese prime minister since Saitō Makoto and Takahashi Korekiyo during the February 26 incident in 1936. Prime Minister Kishida decided to hold a state funeral for Abe on 27 September.

Background

Shinzo Abe had served as Prime Minister of Japan between 2006 and 2007 and again from 2013 and 2020, when he resigned due to health concerns. He was the longest-serving prime minister in Japan's postwar history.

Nobusuke Kishi, his maternal grandfather, was Prime Minister of Japan from 1957 to 1960, and like Abe, was the target of an assassination attempt. Unlike Abe, he survived.

Abe was the first former Japanese prime minister to have been assassinated since Saitō Makoto and Takahashi Korekiyo, who were killed during the February 26 incident in 1936, the first Japanese legislator to be assassinated since Kōki Ishii was killed by a member of a right-wing group in 2002, and the first Japanese politician to be assassinated during an electoral campaign since Iccho Itoh, then-mayor of Nagasaki, who was shot dead during his mayoral race in April 2007.

Relationship between Abe's family and the Unification Church
Abe, as well as his father Shintaro Abe and his grandfather Nobusuke Kishi, had longstanding ties to the Unification Church (UC), a new religious movement known for its mass wedding ceremonies. Known officially as the Family Federation for World Peace and Unification (FFWPU), the movement was founded by Sun Myung Moon in Korea in 1954 and its followers are colloquially known as "Moonies". Moon was a self-declared messiah and ardent anti-communist. 

Nobusuke Kishi's postwar political agenda led him to work closely with Ryoichi Sasakawa, who had been jailed as a fascist war criminal at the end of the Second World War. As Moon's advisor, Sasakawa helped establish the UC in Japan in 1963 and assumed the roles of both patron and president of the church's political wing, International Federation for Victory over Communism (IFVOC), which would forge intimate ties with Japan's conservative politicians. In this way, Sasakawa and Kishi shielded what would become one of the most widely distrusted groups in contemporary Japan.

Moon's organisations, including the UC and the overtly political IFVOC, were financially supported by Ryoichi Sasakawa and Yoshio Kodama.

When the UC still had a few thousand followers, its headquarters was located on land once owned by Kishi in Nanpeidaichō, Shibuya, Tokyo, and UC officials frequently visited the adjacent Kishi residence. By the early 1970s, UC members were being used by the Liberal Democratic Party (LDP) as campaign workers without compensation. LDP politicians were also required to visit the UC's headquarters in South Korea and receive Moon's lectures on theology, regardless of their religious views or membership. In return, Japanese authorities shielded the UC from legal penalties over their often-fraudulent and aggressive practices. Subsequently, the UC gained much influence in Japan, laying the groundwork for its push into the United States and its later entrenchment.

Such a relationship was passed on to Kishi's son-in-law, former foreign minister Shintaro Abe, who attended a dinner party held by Moon at the Imperial Hotel in 1974. In the US, the 1978 Fraser Report – an inquiry by the US Congress into American–Korean relations – determined that, Kim Jong-pil, founder and director of the Korean C.I.A. an associate of Yoshio Kodama and from 1971 to 1975 Prime Minister of South Korea, had "organized" the UC in the early 1960s and was using it "as a political tool" on behalf of authoritarian President Park Chung-hee and the military dictatorship. In 1989, Moon urged his followers to establish their footing in Japan's parliament, then install themselves as secretaries for the Japanese lawmakers, and focus on those of [Shintaro] Abe's faction in the LDP. Moon also stressed that they must construct their political influence not only in the parliament, but also on Japan's district level.

Shinzo Abe continued this relationship, and in May 2006, when he was Chief Cabinet Secretary, he and several cabinet ministers sent congratulatory telegrams to a mass wedding ceremony organised by the UC's front group, Universal Peace Federation (UPF), for 2,500 couples of Japanese and Korean men and women.

In spring 2021, the chairman of the UPF's Japanese branch, called Abe and asked if the latter would consider speaking before an upcoming UPF rally in September if former US president Donald Trump also attended. Abe replied that he had to accept the offer should that be the case; he formally agreed to his participation on 24 August 2021. At the September rally, held ten months before the assassination, Abe stated to Kajikuri that, "The image of the Great Father [Moon] crossing his arms and smiling gave me goosebumps. I still respectably remember the sincerity [you] showed in the last six elections in the past eight years." Kajikuri claimed that he originally invited three unnamed former Japanese prime ministers, but was turned down due to concern of being used as poster boys for UC's mission.

According to research by Nikkan Gendai, ten out of twenty members in the Fourth Abe Cabinet had connections to the UC, but these connections were largely ignored by Japanese journalists. After the assassination, Japanese defence minister Nobuo Kishi, Abe's younger brother, was forced to disclose that he had been supported by the UC in past elections.

Unification Church practices in Japan
The Japanese government certified the UC as a religious organisation in 1964; the Agency for Cultural Affairs classifies the UC as a Christian organisation.

According to historians, up to 70% of the UC's wealth has been accumulated through outdoor fundraising rounds. Steven Hassan, a former UC member, engaged in the deprogramming of other UC members, describes these as "spiritual sales" (reikan shōhō, 霊感商法), with parishioners scanning obituaries, going door-to-door, and saying, "Your dead loved one is communicating with us, so please go to the bank and send money to the Unification Church so your loved one can ascend to heaven in the spirit world."
 
Moon's theology teaches that his homeland Korea is the "Adam country", home of the rulers destined to control the world. Japan is the "fallen Eve country". The dogma teaches Eve had sexual relations with Satan and then seduced Adam, which caused mankind to fall from grace (original sin), while Moon was appointed to bring mankind to salvation. Japan must be subservient to Korea. This was used to encourage their Japanese followers into offering every single material belonging to Korea via the church.

According to journalist  and other former UC followers, the conditions for Japanese followers to participate in the UC's mass wedding were substantially more difficult than Korean people, on grounds of "Japan's sinful occupation of Korea" between 1910 and 1945. In 1992, each Japanese follower needed to successfully bring three more people into the church, fulfill certain quota of fundraising by selling the church's merchandise, undergo a 7-day long fasting, and pay an appreciation fee of 1.4 million yen. For Korean people, the fee for attending the mass wedding was 2 million won (about 200 thousand yen in September 2022). Most Korean attendees were not followers of the church to begin with, as UC considered it was an honour for a Japanese woman to be married to a Korean man, like an abandoned dog being picked up by a prince. If the Japanese followers wanted to leave their partners of the mass wedding or the church, they would be told that they be damned to the "hell of hell".

In 1987, about 300 lawyers in Japan set up an association called the National Network of Lawyers Against Spiritual Sales (Zenkoku Benren) to help victims of the UC and similar organisations. According to statistics compiled by the association's lawyers between 1987 and 2021, the association and local government consumer centers received 34,537 complaints alleging that UC had forced people to make unreasonably large donations or purchase large amounts of items, amounting to about 123.7 billion yen. According to the internal data compiled by the UC which leaked to the media, the donation by the Japanese followers between 1999 and 2011 was about 60 billion yen annually.

Timeline

Abe's schedule
That event was abruptly cancelled on 7 July following allegations of misconduct and corruption related to Matsuyama, and was replaced by a similar event in Nara Prefecture at which Abe was to deliver a speech in support of Kei Satō, an LDP councillor running for re-election. The LDP division in Nara Prefecture stated this new schedule was not generally publicly known, but NHK reported that the event had been widely advertised on Twitter and by sound truck. Nara police and Satō's campaign staff inspected the site on the evening before the incident, and the head of the prefectural police had approved of the security plan a few hours before the incident; one prefectural assembly member later said, "I thought it was a dangerous place that made it easy to attack former Prime Minister Abe from the cars and bicycles that pass along the road behind him". 

At approximately 11:10 a.m. on 8 July, Satō began speaking at a road junction near the north exit of Yamato-Saidaiji Station in Nara City. Abe arrived nine minutes later, and began his speech at around 11:29 am. He was accompanied by VIP protection officers from the Tokyo Metropolitan Police Department alongside VIP protection officers from the Nara Prefectural Police.

Assassination

While Abe was delivering his speech, the alleged perpetrator, Tetsuya Yamagami, was able to approach within several metres, despite the presence of security. At around 11:30 am, when Abe said, he was shot at from behind with a homemade gun resembling a sawn-off, double-barreled shotgun capable of firing six bullets at a time. The first shot missed and prompted Abe to turn around, at which point a second shot was fired, hitting Abe in the neck and chest area. Abe then took a few steps forward, fell to his knees, and collapsed. Abe's security detained the suspect, who did not resist. According to security guards stationed during the assassination, the sound of the gunshot was very different from that of a conventional firearm, reminiscent of fireworks or tire blowout. This may explain the delay of response from Abe's bodyguards after the first round of gunshot.

Treatment
Paramedics arrived on the scene at 11:37 am, and an ambulance later arrived at 11:41 am. Six out of the twenty-four emergency responders at the scene later showed signs of post-traumatic stress disorder, according to the Nara City Fire Department.

Police sources told NHK that Abe was initially conscious and responsive after being shot. A doctor who arrived at the scene said there were no signs indicating Abe was conscious. Shortly thereafter, he was transported to a local hospital by emergency helicopter with a wound to the right side of his neck and internal bleeding under his left chest, arriving approximately fifty minutes after being shot. He was reported to have no vital signs when he arrived at Nara Medical University Hospital in Kashihara, likely due to cardiopulmonary arrest prior to his arrival. At 2:45 pm, a press conference was held by Prime Minister Fumio Kishida, who stated that Abe was in critical condition and that "doctors [were] doing everything they [could]".

Death declaration
Abe's wife Akie arrived at the hospital at 4:55 pm. Despite doctors' efforts, Abe was pronounced dead at the hospital at 5:03 pm, around five and a half hours after being shot. He was 67 years old. Hidetada Fukushima, a doctor at the hospital, said the cause of Abe's death was blood loss, despite four hours of blood transfusions that saw the administration of 100 units of blood. Fukushima said that Abe was hit by two bullets and that one bullet was not found in Abe's body. The police autopsy concluded Abe died from loss of blood after a bullet damaged an artery under his collarbone.

Visitations 
Several hours after the assassination, both former prime minister Yoshihide Suga and Chief Cabinet Secretary Hirokazu Matsuno visited the hospital where Abe's body was being held.

The body was subject to a judicial autopsy and departed from the hospital with Abe's widow at 5:55 a.m. on 9 July. Five vehicles carrying various old professional acquaintances of Abe's, including former defence minister Tomomi Inada, took part in the motorcade conveying Abe's body back to his home in Tokyo. At 1:35 pm, the party arrived at Abe's Tokyo residence. On their arrival, Sanae Takaichi, the chairman of the LDP Policy Research Council, Tatsuo Fukuda, the chairman of the LDP General Council and Hisashi Hieda, the chairman of Fujisankei Communications Group and a friend of Abe's, received them. Afterwards, Kishida visited for condolences, and former prime ministers Yoshirō Mori and Junichiro Koizumi, Hiroyuki Hosoda (Speaker of the House of Representatives), Akiko Santō (President of the House of Councillors), Toshihiro Nikai (former Secretary-General of the LDP), Kōichi Hagiuda (Abe's close aide and the Minister of Economy, Trade and Industry), Tetsuo Saito (a politician of Komeito and the Minister of Land, Infrastructure, Transport and Tourism), and Yuriko Koike (the Governor of Tokyo) also visited for condolences.

Suspect

 was living in Nara. He was 41 years old during the assassination.

Personal life
Yamagami was born on 10 September 1980 in Mie Prefecture to affluent parents who ran a local construction business. Described as quiet and reserved in high school, he wrote in his graduation yearbook that he "didn't have a clue" what he wanted to do in the future. In an interview with The Asahi Shimbun, a relative had stated that  Yamagami had been struggling since childhood with the Unification Church, that his mother had become a member of. After the death of his maternal grandfather, his mother inherited ownership of the family business. 

Yamagami graduated from Nara Prefectural Koriyama Senior High School in 1998 with plans of becoming a firefighter. Yamagami did not attend university due to his family's financial problems.

Relatives
Yamagami's father committed suicide by jumping in 1984, when Yamagami was four years old. Yamagami's older brother, who had a longtime struggle with lymphoma, was not able to afford medical treatment; he died by suicide in 2015. This tragedy greatly impacted Yamagami, according to his uncle.

As of 14 January 2023, Yamagami's younger sister and mother refused to be interviewed by the media. They were about 37 and 70 years old respectively during the assassination. Yamagami's mother had been briefly living in Yamagami's paternal uncle's home for about a month since the assassination, before she moved to Osaka alone under the assistance of someone from the Unification Church. Yamagami's mother's younger brother died in a traffic accident; Yamagami's maternal grandmother died in 1982 which shocked Yamagami's mother. She is reportedly still a member of the Unification Church after the assassination and is apologetic for the church over her son's alleged crimes.

Yamagami's uncle, the older brother of Yamagami's father, who provided many accounts about Yamagami's family, was 77 years old when the assassination took place. Originally working in the construction contractor industry, he obtained the attorney licence and started his own legal consulting firm in Osaka. Despite being a lawyer himself, he does not represent Yamagami during the latter's criminal proceeding. After Yamagami's father's death by suicide in 1984, he had been providing financial aid for Yamagami's family for about 20 million yen, up until 2020 when Japan was hit by the COVID-19 pandemic. Yamagami's mother often asked him for money in order to donate to the Unification Church while neglecting her children, to the point he once threw a cup of tea on her in a fit of rage.

Japan Maritime Self-Defense Force
Yamagami joined the Japan Maritime Self-Defense Force (JMSDF) in August 2002; he was posted to Kure Naval Base and assigned to the destroyer . In February 2005, while in the military, he attempted suicide in hope of offering his life insurance for his siblings. In an investigation report written by the JMSDF, Yamagami stated that his "life had been ruined by the Unification Church", and that his "brother and sister are in need", wanting to "help them by giving them my life insurance". He moved to the General Affairs Department at the JMSDF 1st Service School in Etajima. He was discharged from the JMSDF in August 2005 as a quartermaster with the rank of leading seaman.

Career after the military
After that Yamagami was working for at least 10 different companies for 17 years until the assassination. In December 2006, he worked in a surveying company as a part-timer, and quit in June 2007. He remained unemployed for 2 years and during that period he obtained the licences of "" and "". Since then he mostly took short-term part-time jobs or dispatched labour and quit swiftly over personnel issues, usually just after about half a year of employment. The longest job he remained in lasted about one year and a half.

In October 2020, Yamagami started working as a forklift operator in Kyoto Prefecture for a manufacturer that operated in the Kansai region. There he was described as quiet. He quit in May 2022 after claiming that he was "feeling unwell". After that Yamagami briefly worked under another temporary staffing firm in Osaka Prefecture until he resigned in early June 2022. Yamagami was unemployed at the time of his arrest.

Criminal proceeding
Yamagami was arrested at the scene on suspicion of attempted murder by Nara Prefectural Police; this later became murder after Abe was pronounced dead. Yamagami was transferred to the Nara Nishi Police Station upon his arrest. He was described as being calm and having made no attempts to flee. Yamagami had no prior criminal history. 

Before any formal charges were brought against Yamagami, he was being held at the Osaka Detention House and had been psychiatrically evaluated to determine if he is mentally competent to be indicted. The evaluation was initially set to end on 29 November, but was extended by a request from prosecutors to 6 February 2023. After an appeal by lawyers for Yamagami, the extension was reduced and set to end on 10 January. On 24 December 2022, it was reported that the Nara District Prosecutor's Office determined that Yamagami was competent enough to stand trial on the murder charge, based on factors including the capability to make his own firearm allegedly used in the assassination. 

On 10 January 2023, Yamagami was transferred back to Nara Nishi Police Station to continue his detainment. An additional charge on Yamagami of violation of Firearm and Sword Possession Control Law was added by the Prosecutor's Office. On 13 January 2023, Yamagami was formally charged with Abe's murder.

While psychiatric assessment of a criminal suspect in Japan usually takes about 3 months, Yamagami's nearly half a year long assessment is considered unusual. Journalist of the  speculated that the prosecutors were waiting for the public sentiment over the assassination to quiet down, due to the aftermath brought by the incident as well as the sympathy and admiration towards Yamagami from the society.

Regarding the possible sentence should Yamagami be convicted of murder, Japanese media cited a similar case in 2007 in which a former gangster leader Tetsuya Shiroo was convicted of murdering Iccho Itoh during the latter's campaign for the re-election of the mayor of Nagasaki City. Shiroo was sentenced to death during the first trial in Nagasaki District Court on ground of "strong antisocial behavior which denies the foundation of democracy". This was overturned and reduced to life imprisonment in a second trial in Fukuoka High Court and Supreme Court as the judges preferred to be cautious of seeking capital punishment in a murder conviction which involved one single victim.

Motive
Yamagami told investigators that his motive had been personal rather than political. After joining the Unification Church around 1991 to 1998, his mother had given the church about 100 million yen (US$720,000), a parcel of land she had inherited from her father, and the house where she lived with her three children; she subsequently declared bankruptcy in 2002. She had continued donating to the church following the bankruptcy. Yamagami's uncle recalled being contacted by Yamagami and his siblings to complain that they had no food at home, electric bills and house rent were often overdue, prompting the relative to deliver meals and money for living expenses.

Yamagami blamed the Unification Church for his family's financial problems and held a grudge against the group. Researching the church's connections to Abe in the months before the attack, he believed the former prime minister spread the church's influence in Japan. 

In a letter sent to journalist  on 7 July, the day before the incident, Yamagami introduced himself as "Mada Tari-nai", a regular commenter under that handle on Yonemoto's blog posts, and stressed that he "had spent [much time] trying to obtain guns". 

Kazuhiro Yonemoto is the editor of a blog reporting on problems experienced by the children of religious cult believers. The letter was sent from Okayama and did not mention the name of the sender, but a "statement of mutual agreement" between Yamagami's family and the Unification Church was enclosed. The agreement arranged the repayment of 50 million yen by the Unification Church, Tetsuya Yamagami's name and address was handwritten on the agreement. 

In the letter, Yamagami wrote that his "connection with the Unification Church dates back about 30 years", he also expressed a desire to kill the entire Moon family but noted that it was unrealistic. He also noted that killing Hak Ja Han, the leader of the Unification Church, or her daughter, would not achieve his goal of getting the Unification Church dissolved. He also wrote that Shinzo Abe was "not my enemy, originally, although I have had negative opinions about him. Abe was just one of the Unification Church's sympathizers who wields the most influence in the real world." Yonemoto found the letter in his home mailbox on 13 July, five days after the assassination. A draft copy of the letter was found on Yamagami's computer.

Kazuhiro Yonemoto, who never had met Yamagami before, said: "I think he probably had no one to talk to and wanted to express his feelings to someone. He may have thought I was his friend because I operate the blog he posted on. I understand the suffering of believers' children. But I wish he had consulted with me directly before going that far." Yonemoto initially refused to hand the letter over to police, and it was later seized. Yamagami stated that his Twitter account was @333_hill in his letter to Yonemoto. The account was made in October 2019, with Hak Ja Han scheduled to visit Aichi Prefecture the same month.

Yamagami posted on Twitter that he was "willing to die to liberate every person involved in the Unification Church", and that he had "no concern about what will happen to the Abe administration as a result". Yamagami's Twitter account was suspended from 19 July due to an unspecified violation of Twitter's company policies. A Twitter account belonging to Yamagami was suspended in 2019 for violating Twitter's policies on "abusive language, threatening, or discriminatory language or behavior". 

An analysis of Yamagami's tweets indicates he was very political because of the Unification Church's involvement in Yamagami's family. The most discussed topics among his tweets were "North/South Korea", followed by "gender inequality", "left winger/liberalism" and "constitution/reinterpretation of self-defense". However, when it came to his emotional reaction to each topic, his hatred was championed by the "Unification Church", far away from his "family", then "North/South Korea" and "Shinzo Abe".

Media reported that the difficult circumstances endured by Yamagami and his siblings were very similar to the "shūkyō nisei", otherwise known as the "religious second generations", a Japanese term categorising children being raised by parents who are enthusiastic with their religious practices while neglecting or abusing their children. Abe's assassination brought the nisei issue under spotlight in Japan's mainstream media, and more nisei victims began to be outspoken of their hardships and the inaction from the government, despite the anxiety to be identified as one of the nisei.

Planning
Yamagami said his initial plan was to assassinate a high-ranking official of the Unification Church, but later decided to target Abe instead. From around the time his mother went bankrupt, Yamagami wandered around the Unification Church building carrying a knife, looking for an opportunity to kill Hak Ja Han. He planned to kill Han with a Molotov cocktail when she visited Aichi Prefecture in 2019, but gave up because he could not enter the church building. 

Yamagami told investigators that he initially considered making a bomb and purchased a pressure cooker to create a bomb, but eventually decided to change his plan after realising it could maim or kill innocent bystanders when it exploded. Instead, he made guns that he "could easily fix on a target". 

Yamagami allegedly decided to change his target to Abe after learning of his video speech to an event held by the Unification Church's front organisation in September 2021, in which Abe praised Hak Ja Han, the leader of the church. He proceeded to stalk the former prime minister at various locations as he planned his attack over a period of several months. On the day before the assassination, Yamagami travelled by Shinkansen and attended an LDP rally in Okayama Prefecture with the intent of killing Abe there; he was forced to backtrack due to entry protocols. After Abe's schedule was changed to allow him to visit Nara City on 8 July, Yamagami kept track of his movements via Abe's website.

Yamagami's residence is a five-minute walk from Shin-Ōmiya Station; the westbound next stop on the Kintetsu Nara line is Yamato-Saidaiji Station, where the assassination was carried out.

In order to dry his homemade gunpowder, Yamagami rented an apartment between March and September 2021. He later rented a garage in Nara from November 2021 to February 2022 for the same purpose, costing him 15,000 yen per month. Yamagami was unemployed after resigning in June 2022, at that time he was 600,000 yen in debt with 200,000 yen in his savings account. His one-room apartment's rent was 30,000 yen per month. Making homemade weapons was a costly endeavour for Yamagami, who ran out of cash very soon, could not hold down a steady job, and was several hundreds of thousands of yen in debt, which pushed him to proceed with assassinating Abe in July 2022.

Yamagami told police that he had test-fired his homemade gun in a facility linked to the Unification Church on 7 July, the day he went to Okayama to attend Abe's election campaign and assassinate him, he later gave up. Six bullet holes were discovered by the investigators at the entrance of a building next to the Nara branch of the Unification Church.

Weapon preparations
Yamagami allegedly built the weapon used in the shooting. Police discovered seven homemade firearms similar to that weapon, two of them not finished, as well as possible explosive devices, during a search of his home following his arrest. They were later seized as evidence by bomb disposal officers after nearby residents were evacuated.

Yamagami stated that he tested his improvised firearms by firing them at multiple wooden boards with an aluminium-covered tray for storing dry gunpowder that he produced from fertiliser, which were later recovered from his vehicle. Plastic-based shotgun shells were also seized by police. Yamagami also claimed that he tested his firearms in mountains in Nara Prefecture. 

Yamagami started buying materials needed to make guns and gunpowder in spring 2021, learning how to make guns and bombs from watching YouTube videos. Websites about bomb-making and weapons manufacturing were discovered in Yamagami's browsing history. He told investigators that he originally intended to carry out the assassination using explosives. However, notes obtained from Yamagami's parents' home by the investigators reveal that he did not want to "cause trouble to the bystanders" and believed that an explosive may not kill Abe, so he instead began making his own gun. The gun used in the shooting was fired by a battery igniting the gunpowder with an electrical current.

Idolization
Since Yamagami's apprehension, he has been sympathised and hailed as an icon domestically and abroad. T-shirts printed with Yamagami's photo during Abe's assassination were being sold on Chinese online marketplaces and were worn by some Chinese people in public events. This is believed to be because of Abe's historical negationism by denying the Japanese war crimes committed in China, paying tributes to war criminals commemorated in Yasukuni Shrine, as well as making pro-Taiwan statements.

In Japan, Yamagami's family has been receiving a considerable amount of gift money and presents like foods, clothes and books via online gifting websites from his supporters according to his uncle. When Yamagami's Twitter account noted in his letter for Yonemoto was leaked to the public on 17 July 2022, his Twitter followers surged from zero to over 45,000 within one day. Many of his tweets received a lot of likes and retweets, until his Twitter account was suspended on 19 July. On 10 September 2022, during Yamagami's 42nd birthday, he received a lot of messages of celebration and admiration on social media with the hashtag "Tetsuya Yamagami birthday". Japanese people cosplaying Yamagami's appearance during Abe's assassination were spotted in events like the rally against Abe's state funeral. These cosplayers were holding cardboards displaying the leaders they were against: Abe, Ali Khamenei, Vladimir Putin and Xi Jinping. Even before Yamagami was being officially tried, online petition website Change.org had received over 8,700 signatures which pleaded for reducing Yamagami's sentence as of 8 October 2022. The sponsors of the petition denied the accusation from opponents that they approved murder, but sympathised Yamagami because Yamagami's suffering as a shukyo nisei was not an isolated case. They also saw that Yamagami was working hard to rehabilitate himself so the society should give him one more chance instead of sentencing him to death.

Some theatres cancelled the screening after receiving public complaints, citing reasons such as "disrespect of the deceased" and "justification of terrorism". 

Criminologist  warned that "more people began to justify [their radical actions] when dealing with their family and religious issues", and that Yamagami being "treated and followed like a revolutionary leader was alarming". In a December 2022 editorial of the Japan Times which discusses about Abe's assassination and its aftermath, editor Kanako Takahara commented that the reasons that Yamagami was able to attract so much sympathy from the society is because "the investigations show that [Yamagami] had a very traumatized experience" and "the anger or any emotions involved were simply transferred to the issues involving the Unification Church" while admitting what Yamagami allegedly did was wrong.

Aftermath

Effects on the election
At 11:45 am, the Japanese government established a liaison office within the crisis management center of the Prime Minister's Office. Kishida, who was campaigning in Sagae, Yamagata Prefecture, cancelled his remaining schedule and returned to Tokyo by 2:29 pm. According to Chief Cabinet Secretary Hirokazu Matsuno, all other members of Kishida's cabinet were recalled to Tokyo except the foreign minister, Yoshimasa Hayashi, who was in Indonesia for the 2022 G20 Bali summit. Kishida later ordered heightened security for high-ranking politicians in Japan. Officers from the Security Police were deployed to protect Akie Abe after she arrived in Kyoto as a precautionary measure.

Most political leaders cancelled all campaign events for the remainder of 8 July. Campaigning resumed the day after, on 9 July, with major party leaders vowing to not allow violence to disrupt the democratic process. The LDP subsequently won a supermajority of seats in the House of Councillors in the 10 July elections.

Effects on media broadcast
NHK General TV, and four of Japan's five major commercial television networks, cancelled or postponed all scheduled programming to broadcast live news coverage for the rest of the day, as did several radio stations. Of the shows impacted, the anime series Teppen—!!! had its second episode, scheduled to air on 9 July, cancelled entirely due to the plot of the episode revolving around an attempted assassination.

National Police Agency changes
On 20 August 2022, the National Police Agency announced that rules for conducting VIP protection will be revamped, which will also expand VIP protection training.

The NPA announced that from August 26, 2022, they will examine all VIP protection plans from the prefectural police and will instruct them to make recommended changes if and when it is deemed necessary. The NPA also announced that they will extend their "cyber patrol" force which was originally established to monitor online illegal drug trade and child pornography to also swiftly identify potential threats against VIP found on social media and take early counter measures.

Resignation
On 25 August 2022, Commissioner General Itaru Nakamura of the National Police Agency said that he will resign from his post to take responsibility for the shooting incident on Abe. The chief of the Nara Prefectural Police Tomoaki Onizuka and the director general of the National Police Agency's Security Bureau Kenichi Sakurazawa also announced their resignation.

Unification Church-related

Responses by the Unification Church
Tanaka expressed his sorry and heartfelt condolences. He confirmed that Yamagami was not a believer in the Church, but his mother joined in 1998, temporarily disappeared in 2009, and participated monthly in church events for the last half year. Tanaka stated that the mother was bankrupted around 2002, and there is no record of such donation requests. He said that is a mystery what could lead from the resentment against the Church to the murder, and the Church will cooperate with Police to establish a motive if asked.
Tanaka also downplayed the alleged close tie between the organisation and Abe, stating that the former prime minister, not being a registered member or advisor, only delivered speeches for their "friendly entity", the UPF.

On 14 July, the UC released a statement claiming that before the assassination, they reached an agreement to refund 50 million yen donated by the suspect's mother from 2004 to 2015, and that they have no more record of new donations made by her after the refund. On the other hand, the 50 million yen refunded was again donated to the UC, according to the suspect's relatives.

At a press conference in Seoul on 19 July 2022, Chung Hwan Kwak, a prominent leader in the UC, apologised and stated that the organisation was responsible for Abe's death, saying: "I feel a deep responsibility [for the attack on Abe] because I heard that the motive of the attacker was associated with a grudge against donations [at the UC]. I sincerely apologize," he said. Kwak said that Sun Myung Moon enjoyed a close relationship with Abe's father and grandfather, stating: "Donations from Japan have greatly contributed to Moon's activities around the world". Kwak argued that he tried to reform the UC's Japanese branch and end the practice of spiritual sales, but that Jung Ok Yoo and other church leaders resisted and allowed the practice to continue. South Korean church officials and the Japanese branch, on the other hand, denied Kwak's claim.

The UC claimed that negative media reports related to the assassination led to hate speech and death threats against their followers. According to a female receptionist working at the Shibuya office of the UC she has been receiving two to three trolling letters every day, some containing home rubbish and even replacement razors. On 18 August 2022, the church organised a rally in Seoul against the Japanese media. About three thousand followers, comprising a considerable portion of Japanese women married to Korea via the UC's mass weddings, were transported from their facility in Gapyeong County via coaches to participate in this protest. All participants refused to be interviewed by any Japanese media on site, with deliberate intervention from the staff of the church. On 21 August, the UC released a statement on its Japanese site which condemned the media's scrutiny towards the organisation's political ties as a witch hunt, demanding apologies to their followers and threatening legal action. On 27 October 2022, the lawyers representing the UC announced that they filed a civil case for defamation against TBS Radio, Nippon TV and the guests who commentated on their shows, Masaki Kito and Yoshifu Arita, demanding public apologies and a total of 33 million yen in damage.

In an interview with All-Nippon News Network, Korean journalist Song Ju-yeol revealed that, according to an informant, the assassination had thrown the UC into a state of crisis. Negative attention towards the church could realistically impede their capability to raise the funds needed for operating the organisation globally, in which a major portion was contributed by their Japanese followers. The 2023 new year greeting by Tomihiro Tanaka for a private meeting was leaked and reported by media, in that Tanaka addressed to their second generation followers to prepare for a climactic battle against religious persecution, as "2023 marked the 400th anniversary of persecution against Christianity in Japan beginning in 1623".

Responses from the Kishida Cabinet

The assassination resulted in renewed public interest into the relationship between the Unification Church and the LDP. On 31 July 2022, Kishida demanded the members of his party to "carefully explain" their relationship with the church to the public. The alleged relationship caused the Kishida Cabinet's approval to drop, by 8% in July according to Yomiuri Shimbun or by 13% according to NHK. Both polls also showed that over 80% of respondents felt that the disclosure by the politicians of their relationship with the UC was insufficient. On 6 August, Kishida announced that he would reshuffle his cabinet on 10 August, much earlier than September 2022 as had been originally scheduled, and that all members of the next cabinet would be closely examined of their ties with the church. Taro Kono, the newly appointed Minister of Digital Affairs in this reshuffle, established a "Spiritual Sales Review Committee" in the Consumer Affairs Agency to hold weekly meeting with experts in cult-related frauds, including Masaki Kito of the anti-cult lawyers network Zenkoku Benren. In a 9 December 2022 consumer committee special meeting, Kono stated that he personally recognises the Unification Church as a "cult".

On 24 October 2022, one of the retaining ministers in the reshuffled cabinet, Daishiro Yamagiwa, announced his resignation as the Minister of Economic Revitalization, after being criticised for his past engagements with the UC, announcing his ties with the UC only after the reshuffle to the public, and unsatisfactory responses regarding his participations in the UC-related events such as "I have no memory" or "I have no record" when being questioned by the media and opposition lawmakers.

Civil responses
Almost a year before the assassination, in September 2021, the anti-cult lawyers group Zenkoku Benren sent an open protest letter to Shinzo Abe, after he had sent the video message to an online meeting of the Universal Peace Federation. In the letter, the lawyers protested that his video message constituted an "endorsement," stating: "We urge you to think carefully about this for the sake of your own honour."

On 11 July 2022, in Tokyo's Chiyoda Ward lawyers of Zenkoku Benren held a press conference in response to the assassination. After offering their condolences to Abe, they objected to the UC's claims that it reformed its practices in 2009 after it came under police investigation. Hiroshi Yamaguchi, an advocacy group representative, said that the UC's "explanation that there is no coercion of donations is a lie." The amount of damages reported by victims in Japan has been higher in recent years, the lawyers said, totalling 5.1 billion yen in more than 400 cases between 2017 and 2020. They emphasised that the activities of the UC are inseparable from front groups, including the UPF, they are all part of a "religious conglomerate" working toward the goal of "unifying" the world under their church. The advocacy group released a statement urging politicians to refrain from any actions that express support for the religious group.

The  indicated that: "Neither administrative bodies or politicians in the administration did anything about the activities of the former Unification Church in the past 30 years".

The National Family Association of Victims of the Unification Church, founded in 2003, received a surge of inquiries for helping their family members leave the UC. In June 2022, before the assassination, there were eight inquiries for the association; in July 2022, the number of inquiries jumped to 94; in August 2022, the number exceeded 100.

Because there were previous instances of students lured into the UC via the workers of "CARP" (for Collegiate Association for the Research of Principles), a UC-front organisation which was not acknowledged by the university, lingering around the campus, Osaka University erected warning signs in the campus to urge students to avoid cult-related groups like CARP. The signs listed the common behaviours of the workers of such group like asking for personal contact or taking survey. Since 2004, Osaka University provided lectures to all first-year students about the problems with religious cults and how to deal with them on campus. Many other schools, including Waseda University, Keio University and Ritsumeikan University, warned first-year students about on-campus recruitment activities. According to World CARP Japan (WCJ), the Japanese organisation of CARP, there are about 30 CARP-circles active in universities across Japan, where they help clean up communities and teach primary school children.

Examination of dissolving the Unification Church
The rationales being that the UC was engaging in activities which were "clearly detrimental to the public welfare" and/or "out of line with the purpose of the religious organization." Professor of constitutional law  said that stripping the religious status of an organisation does not violate the religious freedom guaranteed by the Constitution of Japan, but it would merely strip them of benefits such as tax break enjoyed by registered religious entity. In October 2022, the leaders of the Aum Shinrikyo's succeeding unregistered religious groups, Aleph and Hikari no Wa, answered to media interviews that their religious activities had not been hindered by the government since the 1996 dissolution order.

Since Abe's assassination, a woman under the pseudonym "Sayuri Ogawa" (小川 さゆり) as one of the former UC followers, who felt suffered financially and mentally, has become outspoken about her past experiences of how she felt being exploited by the church and her own parents. On 14 September 2022, she was arranged by the Japan News Network to speak face to face with the Minister of Justice Yasuhiro Hanashi on air and demanded passing new laws to regulate the malpractices of the UC and protect children from religious parents. On 6 October 2022, she and her husband held a press conference to explain their view on the church and why they feel exploited, which was interrupted by a message sent by her parents via the UC, who accused her of lying pathologically due to her mental illness. By the end of the press conference, she demanded the dissolution of the UC in tears. 

Initially the Chief Cabinet Secretary Hirokazu Matsuno responded that the request must be considered with utmost prudence with regards of the precedents. On 16 October 2022, Prime Minister Kishida announced a probe of the UC would be launched regarding the allegations of their anti-social activities, and suggested the possibility of dissolving the UC depending on the report of the investigation. On the next day, organisations of anti-cultism and cult victims initiated an online petition demanding government officials to strip the UC of its religious juridical person status. As of 6 December 2022, the petition has garnered over 200 thousand signatures.

Legislation to restrict donations to religious organisations and provide relief to their victims 

On December 10, the House of Representatives and the House of Councillors passed two bills to restrict the activities of religious organisations such as the UC and provide relief to victims. These bills were designed to address social problems caused by the Unification Church, and the political parties and the media saw these bills as a way to restrict "cults" in the process leading up to the legislation.

The new law stipulates prohibited acts and duty of care for juridical persons, including religious organisations, when soliciting donations. Prohibited acts include the following: a juridical person must not induce the donor to borrow money or sell their home or fields in order to raise the funds for the donation, a juridical person must not accompany the donor to a place from which the donor is unable to leave, and a juridical person must not prevent the donor from consulting with someone. The duty of care is that the juridical person shall not suppress the free will of the soliciting subject and that the solicitation shall not make life difficult for the soliciting subject's family. If a juridical person commits a prohibited act, a correction order is issued, and a person who repeatedly violates the order is subject to imprisonment for up to one year and a fine of up to 1,000,000 yen. If a juridical person violates its duty of care, the name of the juridical person will be made public. It was also stipulated that contracts for donations or sales of goods through spiritual sales, i.e. inducing psychological fear or promising spiritual salvation, can be revoked up to 10 years after the contract is concluded and up to three years after the target of the solicitation becomes aware of the damage. In addition, it is also stipulated that donations contracted while the target of the solicitation is under brainwashing can be cancelled. The law also stipulates that the victim's family can also revoke the donation due to improper solicitation, and that the victim or his/her family can claim from the juridical person the amount of past damages as well as living expenses and child support that the child or spouse is entitled to in the future. The new law then defines spiritual sales, in which a contract can be rescinded, as soliciting donations or selling goods after taking advantage of the anxiety of the target of the solicitation or causing the target of the solicitation to become anxious. Minister of State for Consumer Affairs and Food Safety Taro Kono will have jurisdiction over these laws.  

These bills were supported by the ruling Liberal Democratic Party and Komeito, and opposition parties the Constitutional Democratic Party of Japan (CDP), Nippon Ishin no Kai, and Democratic Party for the People, and opposed by the opposition parties the Japanese Communist Party (JCP) and the Reiwa Shinsengumi. The CDP had opposed the bills, seeking legislation to more strictly restrict religious organisations, but switched to support it after a clause to review the law two years later was specified in the bills. According to the CDP and some Unification Church victims, legislation to restrict religious organisations even more strictly is needed. The JCP had proposed another bill to restrict religious organisations and therefore opposed the bills. Sayuri Ogawa, who was invited to spectate the parliament when the bills were being passed, was grateful of the new laws to be made in such a tight schedule of the parliament, but she also stressed that there are still many challenges ahead [surrounding the UC and its victims] with the most pressing one being passing new bill protecting children from religious abuse; Lawyer Hiroshi Yamaguchi who represents Zenkoku Benren wished that there would have been more time to make a solid bill. He worried that under the new laws it would still be difficult to prove that the claimant's free will was being suppressed when accepting the transaction, also the definition of what allows the victim's child or spouse to demand restitution on behalf of their relative was too narrow to be practical.

Wake and funeral 

In the afternoon of 11 July, Abe's casket was transported to the Zōjō Temple in Shiba Park of the Minato ward of Tokyo, where several feudal shoguns are buried. A wake for Abe began at 6:00p.m. Over 2,500 people attended, according to the LDP.

A Buddhist funeral for Abe took place at Zōjō Temple on the next day. The ceremony, conducted by priests from the Jōdō-shū tradition, was restricted to Abe's family and select others from the LDP. Following the funeral, Abe's casket was transported through the Nagatachō district with large crowds watching the procession from the pavements. The casket was driven past LDP headquarters, the National Diet Building and the Prime Minister's Office before being taken to Kirigaya Funeral Hall in the Shinagawa ward for a private funeral. During the funeral, Abe received a posthumous name that reflected his life on the political stage. A farewell ceremony has been planned for sometime after the funeral and the traditional 49-day mourning period. The location is planned to be within the Yamaguchi 4th district and within Tokyo.

On 12 August 2022, the UPF held an international conference in Seoul which was attended by foreign dignitaries such as Mike Pompeo, Newt Gingrich, and Stephen Harper. None of the dignitaries from Japan attended. Part of the venue was dedicated to giving a memorial service for Abe. While not attending personally, Donald Trump and Mike Pence's video messages were also played during the event. The event stated that Abe died while participating in a movement for peace.

State funeral

On 14 July 2022, six days after the assassination, the Kishida Cabinet formally decided a state funeral of Abe to be held on 27 September at the Nippon Budokan. The cost of the entire ceremony would be paid by the national coffer, drawn from the "annual contingency fund" which was meant for emergency situations like natural disasters. On 26 August, the cabinet approved a budget of 249.4 million yen (about US$1.8 million in August 2022) which did not include the cost of security, but in an estimation announced by the cabinet on 6 September, the grand total of the actual cost with inclusion of security (800 million yen), hosting foreign dignitaries (600 million yen) and other miscellaneous cost (10 million yen) would be at least 1.66 billion yen. The cabinet made the decision without seeking consensus in the parliament, but attempted to convince the opposing lawmakers after they finalised the decision. Kishida insisted pushing forward the state funeral on the grounds of Abe being the longest serving prime minister of Japan, as well as his achievements on domestic affairs and foreign policies. On the other hand, Kishida reaffirmed that, similar to Yoshida's state funeral, the government would only plead with, but not mandate the public to mourn Abe during his state funeral.

There was one precedent of a state funeral for a post-war Japanese leader, Shigeru Yoshida, held in 1967 which costed 18 million yen of tax money. Originally the "State Funeral Decree" (国葬令) was enacted in 1926 by the end of Taisho period. Articles three and five stipulated that the "prime minister shall conduct a state funeral for any one who made exceptional contribution to the country not of the imperial family under the Emperor's decree". After the Second World War, the new Constitution of Japan went into effect in 1947, and the State Funeral Decree was declared null and void. Although the state funeral for Yoshida decided by the then Prime Minister Eisaku Satō lacked any constitutional basis, by that time, only the Japanese Communist Party opposed the decision. Post-war funerals for the Emperor of Japan, while technically following the custom of a state funeral, have been known as the "" since 1947.

Attendees 

Kishida's determination to hold Abe's state funeral was described by the media as a form of "" to convey his will to inherit Abe's legacy domestically and internationally. However, when compared to the state funeral of Elizabeth II held on 19 September, one week before Abe's state funeral, the media pointed out that the foreign dignitaries attending Abe's funeral were less influential, comprising mostly former heads of state, and none of the incumbent leaders of the G7 attended. Nippon TV cited an anonymous government official who explained that many leaders who attended Elizabeth II's funeral were unsure if it was appropriate to conduct two consecutive trips abroad in such a short period of time. All-Nippon News cited another official who commented that there were almost no notable foreign dignitaries who could attend, and that Kishida was wrong for being overly optimistic of his "funeral diplomacy" plan. Among those who received but eventually turned down invitations were Barack Obama, Donald Trump, Joe Biden, Angela Merkel, and Emmanuel Macron. Justin Trudeau cancelled his schedule three days before the funeral as Hurricane Fiona, a category 4 tropical cyclone, was causing serious damage across Atlantic Canada.

Representatives from 218 foreign countries, regions and international organisations attended the funeral, which included heads of state and government as well as ambassadors and cabinet members.

On 20 September 2022, former Japanese Prime Minister Naoto Kan stated that he would not attend Abe's state funeral. Kan's predecessor, former Prime Minister Yukio Hatoyama also did not attend Abe's state funeral.

Reactions to the state funeral

A state funeral is a stark break from recent funerals for other post-war Japanese leaders, which have been jointly organised and paid for by the Cabinet and the LDP. The Cabinet's decision has been met with mixed reactions, as there is currently no legal founding that clarifies eligibility or how a state funeral should be conducted. An injunction requesting a suspension to the Cabinet's decision and budget for the event had been filed at the district courts in Tokyo, Saitama, Yokohama and Osaka by civil groups on 21 July, which states the lack of parliamentary approval and infringement of a constitutional right to freedom of belief. All these lawsuits were dismissed by all courts on 9 September. The letter condemned the 2015 Japanese military legislation (legalisation of Japan's right to collective self-defense), one of Abe's controversial legacies during his tenure, which was described by JCJ as destroying the Constitution and peace diplomacy of Japan, but Kishida attempted to praise such legacy via a state funeral paid by taxpayers' money. Anti-cult journalist  expressed his concern that Abe's state funeral could be used by the Unification Church to lure more victims into their organisation because of Abe's overt endorsement of their leader Hak Ja Han. On 22 September, in a third press conference held by the Unification Church in response to the assassination and spiritual sales, they would announce their support for Abe's state funeral out of "tremendous respect" for Abe.

Opponents of the state funeral organised public rallies. One on 22 July, about 400 people gathered before the Prime Minister's Office. A second one on 16 August had more than a thousand people marching peacefully on the street of Shinjuku in Tokyo. A third one on 31 August organised by the opposition parties saw more than 2500 people protesting before the National Diet Building. On 19 September, two separate anti-state-funeral rallies occurred in Shibuya and Sapporo. On 21 September 2022, a man, believed to be in his 70s, set himself alight near the Prime Minister's Office, after apparently writing an anti-state funeral note. 

On the day of the state funeral, about 200,000 police officers were deployed around Budokan to maintain law and order. About 3,000 opponents of the state funeral, led by opposing parties, marched from the Diet to Budokan. On their way, they clashed physically with proponents, while police officers attempted to separate the two parties outside of Budokan.

In the immediate aftermath of the shooting, many people were in favour of a state funeral, partly due to the shock. As the controversial relationships of the conservative ruling Liberal Democratic Party (LDP) and the UC were revealed in an investigation, public opinion began to voice "opposition to state funerals". Koji Nakakita, a professor of political science at Hitotsubashi University, commented on the reason for the increase in public opinion against the state funeral, saying, "The biggest problem is the issue of the former Unification Church. When the shooting occurred, some people sympathized with it as 'blasphemy against democracy'. However, the tide turned sharply when the problems of the cult came to the surface." He pointed out that Abe and others had received cooperation from the cult during the national elections, commenting, "Was the former Unification Church used to win?"

Misinformation
Video capturing the surrounding area of the assassination from the sky by the television station was widely shared online by conspiracy theorists as a proof of Abe's death by sniper rifle, instead of Yamagami's homemade gun, from the roof of the nearby shopping mall Sanwa City Saidaiji. The conspiracy theory claimed that there was a white tent spotted on the roof of the mall in the video, and that tent was used as a hideout by the sniper. The management company of Sanwa City Saidaiji clarified that the tent was set up for the purpose of cleaning the ventilation ducts, and denied the possibility that it could have been used by anyone without authorisation. A comedian admitted that he was responsible for spreading this conspiracy theory online. After receiving criticism, he published an apology video on YouTube.

Several media outlets misidentified the video game developer Hideo Kojima as the assassin. The misreporting allegedly stemmed from jokes on the online message board 4chan and Twitter that were taken as fact and subsequently published by the far-right French politician , the Greek news outlet ANT1, and the Iranian website Mashregh News. ANT1 additionally reported that the suspect was "passionate about Che Guevara". ANT1 uploaded the broadcast to its YouTube account, but later removed it. Rieu took down the original tweet and issued an apology. Kojima's company, Kojima Productions, condemned the false reports and threatened legal action against those perpetuating the rumour.

Some social media users also falsely claimed that a fabricated tweet by Abe, detailing supposed information that could incriminate Hillary Clinton, led to his death.

Copycat threats 
Thirty minutes after the shooting, a threatening phone call was made to Matsuyama's office, where Abe had been initially scheduled to deliver a speech. A suspect was arrested on 9 July for making threats.

The Hyogo prefectural police are investigating a death threat and resignation demand for Akashi Mayor Fusaho Izumi, who previously served as an aide to the assassinated lawmaker Kōki Ishii.

Hours after the shooting, online assassination threats were made in Singapore and Taiwan against their respective leaders, Prime Minister of Singapore Lee Hsien Loong and Republic of China president Tsai Ing-wen. In Singapore, a 45-year-old man was arrested after his threats online were reported to the police. In Taiwan, the threat came from a 22-year-old man in Tainan, who was arrested at his home in Yongkang District.

Thailand additionally tightened security around its government officials and planned to increase security at the upcoming Asia-Pacific Economic Cooperation summit, due to be hosted in Bangkok on 17–18 November.

Reactions

Domestic

Incumbent prime minister Fumio Kishida called the assassination an "unforgivable act" and an "act of cowardly barbarism". Noting that Abe was shot while delivering a campaign speech, Kishida also denounced the assassination as an attack on Japan's democracy and vowed to defend a "free and fair election at all costs".

Before Abe's death was announced, Governor of Tokyo Yuriko Koike stated that "no matter the reason, such a heinous act is absolutely unforgivable. It is an affront against democracy." Kazuo Shii, chairman of the Japanese Communist Party, called the assassination "barbaric", an attack on free speech and an act of terrorism in a post to Twitter. Tomohiko Taniguchi, a former advisor to Abe, compared his death to the assassination of John F. Kennedy in terms of likely social impact in Japan.

Tomoaki Onizuka, head of Nara Prefecture Police, acknowledged security lapses at the political rally where Abe was killed, and pledged to identify and resolve the flaws, "It is undeniable that there were problems with the security for former prime minister Abe, and we will immediately identify the problems and take appropriate measures to resolve them".

On 11 July, Kishida's cabinet decided to award Abe Junior First Rank, as well as the Collar of the Supreme Order of the Chrysanthemum and Grand Cordon of the Supreme Order of the Chrysanthemum effective 8 July, making Abe the fourth former prime minister since Yasuhiro Nakasone to be conferred the Collar under the current Constitution.

International

In response to the shooting and Abe's subsequent death, representatives of numerous countries, including present and former world leaders, expressed their condolences.

Anthony Albanese, prime minister of Australia, said that Japan had emerged as "one of Australia's most like-minded partners in Asia" under Abe's leadership. Albanese also mentioned Abe's foreign policy contributions, adding that the "Quad and the Comprehensive and Progressive Agreement for Trans-Pacific Partnership are in many ways the results of his diplomatic leadership". Albanese said that Abe's legacy was "one of global impact, and a profound and positive one for Australia". Landmarks in Melbourne, Adelaide, Sydney and Perth were lit up in red and white, and flags were flown at half-mast on the day of the funeral.

National days of mourning were declared in Bangladesh, Brazil, India, Nepal, Bhutan, Cambodia, Cuba and Sri Lanka, with all countries flying their flags at half-mast on their respective days of mourning. In Bangladesh, a day of state mourning was declared for 9 July. Jair Bolsonaro, president of Brazil, ordered three days of national mourning in Brazil, which is home to the world's largest population of Japanese descent outside of Japan. Narendra Modi, prime minister of India, announced that India would observe a day of national mourning on 9 July; Modi's reaction was regarded by some as an extremely personal one compared to other world leaders particularly for his addressal of the former Prime Minister as "Abe-san" in his blog where he paid tributes. Nepal and Bhutan declared their respective days of mourning for 9 July. Cambodian prime minister Hun Sen announced 10 July as a day of national mourning with entertainment venues being closed for that day. Cuba observed a day of national mourning on 11 July. On 12 July, Sri Lanka observed a day of national mourning with its flag flown at half-mast on state buildings. While formal mourning days were not proclaimed in Thailand, the government did fly flags at half-mast on 8 July, and the Thai Prime Minister Prayut Chan-o-cha paid a visit to the Japanese Embassy in Bangkok to pay respects in person.

United States President Joe Biden ordered flags of the United States to be flown at half-staff until 10 July 2022, and visited the Japanese embassy to sign a condolence book. Secretary of State Antony Blinken made an unscheduled stop in Tokyo per request from President Biden, en route from the G20 Summit to the US, then met with PM Kishida to offer condolences in person, and shared letters that President Biden had written to the Abe family. Secretary of the Treasury Janet Yellen cancelled her visit to the Port of Yokohama during her visit to Japan, which was scheduled prior to the assassination of Abe. Yellen, alongside the Ambassador to Japan Rahm Emanuel, attended Abe's wake at Zōjō Temple on 11 July. Back in the US, members of both the Democratic and Republican parties offered tributes to Abe.

The European Council released a photo and video library in memory of Abe, featuring the former prime minister's diplomatic interactions with leaders across the EU.

Israeli President Isaac Herzog paid tribute to Abe as "one of Japan's most preeminent leaders in modern times", noting that he had been "deeply impressed" by Abe's "leadership, vision and respect for Israel" during his visit to the Jewish state in 2018.

Releasing a joint statement, the leaders of the Quad nations of Australia, India, and the United States noted that the organisation would redouble its work towards "a peaceful and prosperous region" in honour of Abe. The White House noted that Abe played a formative role in the founding of the Quad partnership and worked tirelessly to advance a shared vision for a free and open Indo-Pacific. In his official statement regarding the assassination, Canadian prime minister Justin Trudeau seconded the calls made by the Quad.

President of the Republic of China (Taiwan) Tsai Ing-wen announced that the nation would observe a national day of mourning on 11 July, with the flag of Taiwan flown at half-mast. Taipei 101 was also illuminated in multiple messages mourning the death of Abe. Lai Ching-te, Taiwan Vice-President, visited Abe's residence as a special envoy of President Tsai to mourn Abe, along with Frank Hsieh, Taiwan's envoy to Japan, on 11 July. Lai became the highest-ranking Taiwanese official to visit Japan in 50 years after Japan severed its diplomatic relationship with Taiwan in 1972 in favour of China.

Individuals, non-governmental organisations and sports 
The University of Southern California (USC) paid special condolences to Abe, who attended the university for three semesters studying English and Public Policy during a study abroad program. USC's president Carol Folt personally sent her own condolences.

The International Olympic Committee (IOC) president, Thomas Bach, recognised Abe for being instrumental in securing the 2020 Summer Olympics for Tokyo before his tenure ended in 2020 as well as his "vision, determination and dependability" that enabled the IOC to make an unprecedented decision to postpone the Olympics by a year. The Olympic flag was flown in Lausanne at half-mast for three days.

Despite official condolences sent by the Chinese and South Korean governments, many Chinese and South Korean internet users were unsympathetic to Abe's death. This stemmed from grievances concerning historical colonialism and war crimes by Imperial Japan, and towards nationalist Japanese politicians  including Abe  who denied or questioned some accounts of the atrocities. In Japan, the assassination led to a renewed level of scrutiny of the ties between the Unification Church and the Liberal Democratic Party, with the newspaper Mainichi Shimbun running an editorial denouncing the LDP's ties to the organisation; anti-Unification Church slogans trended in Japan on social media platforms, and an online petition was launched seeking to deny Abe state honours due to his ties to the group. As of August 2022, approval for the Kishida government had fallen by 12%, and polling suggested that a majority of Japanese citizens were opposed to Abe being given a state funeral.

The UN Security Council paid tribute to Abe, saying, "He will be remembered as a staunch defender of multilateralism, respected leader, and supporter of the United Nations."

The American magazine Time unveiled the cover of its next issue, prominently featuring Abe's portrait in black and white. This will be Abe's fourth time featured on the magazine, with Time writing Abe would be "remembered for remaking Japan".

See also
 Assassination of Inejirō Asanuma
 Assassination of Itō Hirobumi
 List of assassinations in Japan
 Shūkyō nisei

Notes

References

2022 crimes in Japan
2022 in Japanese politics
July 2022 events in Japan
July 2022 crimes in Asia
Assassinations in Japan
Deaths by firearm in Japan
Deaths by person in Japan
Filmed assassinations
Filmed killings in Asia
Unification Church controversies
History of Nara Prefecture
Nara, Nara
Assassination